Emil Koch (7 June 1897 – 1 June 1978) was a Romanian football defender. Emil Koch played one friendly game for Romania, which ended 1–1 against Poland.

References

External links
 

1897 births
1978 deaths
Romanian footballers
Romania international footballers
Place of birth missing
Association football defenders
Liga I players